The 2014 Bojangles' Southern 500, the 65th running of the event that traces its lineage to the 1957 Rebel 300, was a NASCAR Sprint Cup Series stock car race held on April 12, 2014, at Darlington Raceway in Darlington, South Carolina. The race was contested over 374 laps – extended from 367 laps due to two attempts at a green–white–checker finish – on the  oval, it was the eighth race of the 2014 NASCAR Sprint Cup Series. Kevin Harvick of Stewart-Haas Racing won the race, his second win of the season and first at Darlington, while Dale Earnhardt Jr. finished second. Jimmie Johnson, Matt Kenseth, and Greg Biffle rounded out the top five. The race was also the first Darlington race won by a polesitter since Dale Jarrett, in the 1997 Rebel (then a 400-mile race). The top rookies of the race were Kyle Larson (8th), Austin Dillon (11th), and Justin Allgaier (23rd).  It was the longest race in Darlington Raceway history.

Previous week's race
Joey Logano passed Jeff Gordon on the final lap to score the victory in the Duck Commander 500 at Texas Motor Speedway. "Talk about a lot of emotion," Logano said. "You feel like you are about to win the race and then the caution comes out when you come to take the white and you’re like, ‘You’ve got to be kidding me.'" “That was a great battle,” said Gordon. “At one point I thought we had a shot at it. We got a pretty good restart. Joey was right on me and I was pretty loose in one and two, and I wish I had gone a little bit higher in three and four. But, he got that run off of four and he got in the back of me, and I thought I was going to wreck, so at that point I was like second would be good."

Report

Background

Darlington Raceway is a four-turn  oval. The track's first two turns are banked at twenty-five degrees, while the final two turns are banked two degrees lower at twenty-three degrees. The front stretch (the location of the finish line) and the back stretch is banked at six degrees. Darlington Raceway can seat up to 60,000 people. Matt Kenseth was the defending race winner after winning the 2013 race.

Entry list
The entry list for the Bojangles' Southern 500 was released on Tuesday, April 8, 2014 at 9:07 a.m. Eastern time. Forty-four drivers were entered for the race.

Practice

First practice
Kyle Larson was forced to go to a backup car after hitting the wall in turn 1.

Second practice

Qualifying
Also having Tim Fedewa up on top as a former driver knowing what is going on to relay what you need to do. We moved up and picked up in the second (session), felt like I didn't roll through there fast enough. In the last (session), felt like I rolled through there pretty good. It all worked out. Knockout qualifying paid off for us today. We were able to save the best for last.” Harvick's car had to go through tech inspection three times before he could take his car onto the track for qualifying. “It just seemed like the machine was a little bit off there for qualifying,’’ Rodney Childers said of NASCAR’s measuring device. “A lot of people had left-rear toe issues. We rolled through the first time and saw what it was and did what we always do to fix that amount, and we rolled back through again and it read the same thing again, which it shouldn't have. It's part of the process. It's up to the teams to get it right. Different teams have different tools in order to know whether they're going to be good or not. We haven't got the right tools developed yet to know that. It's something we’ve got to work on at (Stewart-Haas Racing). NASCAR works hard every week to try to get their machine closer and closer and more consistent. It's a two-way street. We’ve got to do a better job.’’ The only driver that failed to qualify was David Reutimann.

Qualifying results

Race

The race began at 6:45 p.m. Eastern time with Kevin Harvick leading the field to the green flag. He didn't hold the lead for long as Joey Logano passed him to take the top spot.

Jeff Gordon took the lead on lap 38.

The first caution of the race flew on lap 41 after rookie Ryan Truex slammed the wall in turn 3. David Ragan stayed out to lead a lap when Gordon pitted. Ragan made his stop the next lap and Gordon assumed the lead.

The race restarted on lap 47 and Kevin Harvick took the lead for the first time on the restart.

The second caution of the race flew on lap 59 after Travis Kvapil slammed the wall in turn 3. Denny Hamlin exited pit road with the lead by taking just two tires while Harvick took four.

The race restarted on lap 64 and Matt Kenseth took over the lead from his teammate.

Kevin Harvick retook the lead on lap 76.

The third caution of the race flew on lap 93 after rookie Michael Annett slammed the wall in turn 2.

The race restarted on lap 100.

The fourth caution of the race flew on lap 125 after rookie Cole Whitt slammed the wall in turn 1. David Ragan also slammed the wall in turn 2.

The race restarted on lap 131.

Kevin Harvick surrendered the lead on lap 180 to make his pit stop. Brad Keselowski took over the lead.

Keselowski ducked onto pit road on lap 183. Kasey Kahne assumed the lead.

The fifth caution of the race flew on lap 201 after Paul Menard slammed the wall in turn 1. Kahne swapped the lead with Kevin Harvick on pit road with the former stall being behind the start/finish line, but he exited as the leader.

The race restarted on lap 208 and Harvick took over the lead.

Austin Dillon and A. J. Allmendinger rubbed together in turn 2. Allmendinger's left-rear tire began rubbing real bad. He was saved by the sixth caution of the race on lap 222 after Aric Almirola clipped Danica Patrick and spun out in turn 2. Brian Vickers exited pit road with the lead thanks to taking two tires.

The race restarted on lap 227.

Debris in turn 2 brought out the seventh caution of the race on lap 247. Vickers swapped the lead with Jeff Gordon with the former pitting at the entrance of pit road. He exited pit road as the leader.

The race restarted on lap 252.

Kevin Harvick took back the lead on lap 255.

The eighth caution of the race flew with 96 laps to go for debris on the backstretch after Paul Menard slammed the wall exiting turn 2. Greg Biffle exited pit road as the leader thanks to taking just two tires.

The race restarted with 89 laps to go and Kevin Harvick took the lead.

While trying to enter pit road with 49 laps to go, Brian Vickers spun out and about blocked the entrance. He was almost rammed by Marcos Ambrose trying to get his car facing the right direction. He did get it going the right direction, but had to come back down pit road to serve a drive-through penalty not passing to the inside of the pit road commitment line.

Ricky Stenhouse Jr. assumed the lead when Harvick made his stop with 46 laps to go, but he missed the entrance to pit road and did not lead a lap. With 44 laps to go, Kasey Kahne took his car to the garage after slamming the wall in turn 2.

The ninth caution of the race flew with ten laps to go after Joey Logano's engine expired. Jimmie Johnson exited pit road as the leader by taking just two tires. Denny Hamlin was busted for speeding and had to drop to the tail end of the field.

The race restarted with five laps to go.

Debris in turn 3 that came from the No. 32 of Travis Kvapil brought out the tenth caution of the race with three laps to go. With the caution falling this close to the end, the race went into overtime.

Even though the inside line had been the preferred line all night, Johnson chose to restart on the outside. The race restarted with two laps to go on the first green-white-checker attempt and Dale Earnhardt Jr. took the lead from his teammate. They only made it half a lap before the caution flew for the eleventh time after Kurt Busch lost his momentum exiting turn 2, got turned by Clint Bowyer and slammed the inside wall head on.

The race restarted with two laps to go on the second green-white-checker attempt. Earnhardt got an excellent start to get ahead of Harvick, but Kevin with four tires passed Dale on two and took the victory. “This is the one race I told Rodney (Childers, crew chief) I wanted to win,” said Harvick. “We were able to put it all together, but this is the Southern 500, this is as big as it gets in NASCAR racing. It feels great. It's allowed us with the way the points system is to go for wins and not have to worry about the bad weeks too much,” he said. “Really proud for these guys and looking forward to the last 10." “It's a little disappointing to come that close because I know I don't really run that well here and the opportunities to win are going to be very few compared to other tracks,” said Earnhardt Jr. “It hurts a little bit to come that close because we worked so hard to try to win races. Running second is great but nobody is going to really remember that. But we're proud of it.” “Yeah, just very happy to finish there in the top three,” said Johnson. “I thought we had a shot at a win. I think if things stayed green after our last pit stop, we had a good chance at it, good shot at it. I'm happy with (crew chief) Chad's (Knaus) decision to go with two, and there were enough cars that took two that it gave us a little bit of a cushion, maybe enough of a cushion to make it four or five laps there.”

Race results

Race statistics
 Lead changes: 22 among different drivers
 Cautions/Laps: 11 for 50
 Red flags: 0
 Time of race: 3 hours, 53 minutes and 37 seconds
 Average speed:

Media

Television

Radio

Standings after the race

Drivers' Championship standings

Manufacturers' Championship standings

Note: Only the first sixteen positions are included for the driver standings.

References

Bojangles' Southern 500
Bojangles' Southern 500
Bojangles' Southern 500
NASCAR races at Darlington Raceway